"Lazy Love" is a song by American recording artist Ne-Yo, premiere online on May 14, 2012. It officially impacted Urban radio on May 29, 2012 and was released on June 12, 2012 by Motown Records for purchase as a digital download. It is the first single from his album R.E.D. The music video for the song premiered on June 11, 2012. The song peaked at #25 on the Billboard Hot R&B/Hip Hop Songs chart. The music video was directed by Diane Martel.

Background and release 
Ne-Yo's fifth album R.E.D. (2012) is the follow-up to the singer's 2010 concept-heavy studio album, Libra Scale. The album's first single titled "Lazy Love" was premiered online on May 14, 2012, and was serviced to US urban radio on May 29, 2012. On June 12, 2012, the song was released for digital download in the United States. The song entered the Billboard Hot R&B/Hip Hop Songs chart at #97, and peaked at 25. "Lazy Love" is one of two songs which precede the album's release, the other "Let Me Love You (Until You Learn to Love Yourself)" being directed towards mainstream audiences, with its Europop and synthpop production.

Music video
The clean version of the music video was premiered on BET's 106 & Park on June 11, 2012. While the explicit/dirty version of the video premiered the following day on VEVO.

Writing and production 
"Lazy Love" is a down-tempo R&B slow-jam written by Ne-Yo and Robert Shea Talor, with production courtesy of Shea Taylor. The song features a "sonorous base" line and "slow-drip synths" with lyrics that centre on the "languid desire that pins a couple to their sheets way past morning".

Live performances and cover versions
Ne-Yo has performed the song live. He performed it live for the first time on BET's 106 & Park. On May 30, 2014, Australian boy band The Collective released an acoustic cover of "Lazy Love" as a B-side to the physical release of their fourth single "Burn the Bright Lights". The Collective's cover was later released digitally on July 4, 2014 as their fifth single.

Charts

Weekly charts

Year-end charts

References 

2012 songs
2012 singles
Ne-Yo songs
The Collective (band) songs
Motown singles
Contemporary R&B ballads
Songs written by Ne-Yo
Songs written by Shea Taylor
Song recordings produced by Shea Taylor